Matthew Armstrong (26 January 1919 – 12 July 1941) was an English footballer who made 38 appearances in the Football League playing as a wing half for Darlington in the 1930s. He joined Aston Villa in 1939 – a preview in the Daily Express highlighted him as one of "two young defenders who look as if they have that certain Soccer something" – but he never played for Villa's first team before the league was abandoned for the duration of the Second World War.

Armstrong was killed during the Second World War while serving as a private in 149 Field Ambulance, Royal Army Medical Corps. He was 22, and is commemorated on the Brookwood Memorial.

References

1919 births
1941 deaths
People from High Spen
Footballers from Tyne and Wear
Footballers from County Durham
English footballers
Association football wing halves
Darlington F.C. players
Aston Villa F.C. players
Military personnel from County Durham
English Football League players
Royal Army Medical Corps soldiers
British Army personnel killed in World War II
Place of death missing